Wolfgang Schulhoff (14 December 1939 – 17 February 2014) was a German politician. He was a member of the Bundestag, representing Düsseldorf. He was also a member of the CDU.

References

1939 births
2014 deaths
Members of the Bundestag 1998–2002
Members of the Bundestag 1994–1998
Members of the Bundestag 1990–1994
Members of the Bundestag for North Rhine-Westphalia